Ella Leivo (born 26 July 1994 in Tampere) is a Finnish tennis player.

On 28 July 2014, Leivo reached her best singles ranking of world number 1044. On 11 November 2013, she peaked at world number 788 in the doubles rankings.

Leivo has a 4–11 record for Finland in Fed Cup competition.

ITF finals (0–3)

Doubles (0–3)

References 
 
 
 

1994 births
Living people
Sportspeople from Tampere
Finnish female tennis players
20th-century Finnish women
21st-century Finnish women